Exuperius or Exupernis is venerated as a saint and martyr by the Catholic Church; according to tradition, he was the standard-bearer of the Theban Legion and thus a companion to Saint Maurice.

Veneration
Exuperius’ relics were translated in the 10th century to Gembloux Abbey.  This translation was performed by the monastery's founder, Saint Guibert (Guibertus), who dedicated the monastery in honor of Saint Peter and Saint Exuperius.  The saint thus enjoyed special veneration at Gembloux; Sigebert of Gembloux wrote a long poem on the martyrdom of the Theban Legion.  The buildings of the abbey, which largely survived, are used for the Agronomical University of Gembloux.

References 

3rd-century Christian martyrs
286 deaths
Year of birth unknown
Military saints